Limmernsee (or Limmerensee) is a reservoir in the Canton of Glarus, Switzerland, between the peaks of  Muttenchopf (2,482 m), Selbsanft (2,950 m) and Kistenstöckli (2,746 m). It may be reached by aerial tramway or by foot from Linthal.

The Limmern dam was completed in 1963 and is the largest reservoir used by the Linth–Limmern Power Stations.

See also
List of lakes of Switzerland
List of mountain lakes of Switzerland

External links

Zukunft Wasserkraft – Linthal 2015 Kraftwerke Linth-Limmern  Project for the expansion of the Muttsee/Limmernsee reservoirs.

Reservoirs in Switzerland
Lakes of the canton of Glarus
LLimmernsee
Limmern